Kraj is a village located in the southeast part of the island of Pašman, 3 km south of the village of Pašman, 300 m from the coast of the Pašman Channel in Dalmatia, Croatia.  

The village features a Gothic Franciscan monastery with a church from 1392. The gate leading to the monastery yard was restored in Baroque style in 1669. The church was also reconstructed in Baroque style, and at the front is a Renaissance relief of St. Jerome from 1554.

References

Sources
 

Populated places in Zadar County
Pašman